Dolynske (until 1948: Anadol) is a selo in Izmail Raion in the southern Ukrainian oblast of Odesa. It belongs to Reni urban hromada, one of the hromadas of Ukraine. 

Dolynske is famous for the thick succession of Pleistocene water-lain facies containing Kharpov and Taman faunal complexes. The overlying loess-palaeosol sequence constitutes one of the most complete palaeoclimate archives in the Lower Danube Basin.

Until 18 July 2020, Dolynske belonged to Reni Raion. The raion was abolished in July 2020 as part of the administrative reform of Ukraine, which reduced the number of raions of Odesa Oblast to seven. The area of Reni Raion was merged into Izmail Raion.

References 

Villages in Izmail Raion
Reni Hromada